Roald Paulsen (born 6 November 1938) is a Norwegian footballer. He played in one match for the Norway national football team in 1962.

References

External links
 

1938 births
Living people
Norwegian footballers
Norway international footballers
Place of birth missing (living people)
Association footballers not categorized by position